Rupinder Rupi or Roopi Rupinder is an Indian film and television actress, who is known for her work in the Punjabi film industry.  She is famous for appearing in mother's role in most of the films. Her most well-known works are the films Mera Pind, Bailaras, Laavaan Phere, Nadhoo Khan.

Early life and career 
Rupi was born in Amritsar, Punjab, India. She started her acting career as a theater artist.

Filmography 

 Mannat (2006) as Rupinder Kaur
 Mehndi Wale Hath (2006) as Gugni's mother
 Majaajan (2008)
 Mera Pind (2008) as Ruldu's mother
 Peele Patteyaan Di Dastaan (2008) 
 Munde U.K. De (2009)
 Chak Jawana (2010)
 Anhoye (TV series) (2012)
 Rahe Chardi Kala Punjab Di (2012)
 Yaar Pardesi (2012) as Rupinder Barnala
 Jatts in Golmaal (2013)
 Haani (2013) as Gejo Bhua
 Nazara Singh Dheeth Jawaai (2015) as Gyan Kaur
 Mitti Na Pharol Jogiya (2015) as Bebe
 Burf (2015)
 Gadaar: The Traitor (2015) as Rupinder Roopi
 Once Upon a Time in Amritsar (2016) as Gurtej's mother
 Gelo (2016) as Gelo Jagtar's Mother
 25 Kille (2016)
 Darra (2016) as Balkar's Mother
 Desi Munde (2016) as Jaswant Kaur
 Yaar Annmulle 2 (2017)
 Arjan (2017) as Arjan's Mother
 Saab Bahadar (2017) as Deepi's Maami
 Vekh Baraatan Challiyan (2017) as Gurmeet Kaur
 Rupinder Gandhi 2: The Robin Hood (2017)
 Bailaras (2017)
 Jatt Vs Rabb (2017) as Tayi
 Punjab Singh (2018) as Tayi
 Laavan Phere (2018) as Gurmel Kaur
 Tabbar (2018)
 Daana Paani (2018) as Basant's Aunt
 Asees (2018) as Singh Kaur
 Vadhayiyaan Ji Vadhayiyaan (2018)
 Dhol Ratti (2018) as Bebe
 Parahuna (2018)
 Marriage Palace (2018) as Gurnam Kaur
 Do Dooni Panj (2019) as Anju Devi
 Baby Dolls (2019) as Maami Mukho
 Band Vaaje (2019) as Billo's mother
 Munda Faridkotia (2019) as Kulwant Kaur Brar
 Nadhoo Khan (2019) as Paasho
 Shadaa (2019) as Boli vali lady
 Mindo Taseeldarni (2019) as Gobindi
 Munda Hi Chahida (2019) as BUA
 Jugni Yaaran Di (2019) as Tea shop owner
 Singham (2019) as Dilsher's mother
 Naukar Vahuti Da (2019) as Goldy's mother
 Surkhi Bindi (2019) as Satya Bhua
 Doorbeen (2019) as Shindo Sarpanchni
 Ardab Mutiyaran (2019) as Babbu's mother
 Amaanat (2019)
 Sufna (2020) as Complaining lady #2
 Balli Te Bandook (2021) as Jeeto's Mother
 Viaah Ch Gaah (2021)
 Waleed (2021) as Pritam Kaur
 Shivjot: Pro Jatts (2021) as Mother Role
 Dukhan Da Darya (2021)
 Mitti (2021)
 Qismat 2 (2021) as Kaabil's mother
 Paani Ch Madhaani (2021)
 Jal Wayu Enclave (2022) as Yaad's mother
 Mera Vyah Kara Do (2022)
 Main Viyah Nahi Karona Tere Naal (2022) as Nimmo
 Galwakdi (2022) as Jagteshwar's Mother
 Maa (2022)
 Sass Meri Ne Munda Jamya (2022)
 True Life - Monty Marzara (2022) as Mother
 Lover (2022) as Heer's mother
 Bajre Da Sitta (2022) as Ratan's mother
 Beautiful Billo (2022)
 Jitt De Nishan (2022)
 Valaiti Yantar (2022) as Banto

References 

Actresses from Punjab, India
Living people
Punjabi people
Indian film actresses
Indian television actresses
20th-century Indian actresses
21st-century Indian actresses
Year of birth missing (living people)